Kalateh Molla Khodadad (also Romanized as Kalāteh-ye Mollā Khodādād; also known as Kalāteh Mollā Khowdābād) is a village in Barakuh Rural District, Jolgeh-e Mazhan District, Khusf County, South Khorasan Province, Iran. At the 2006 census, its population was 35, in 12 families.

References 

Populated places in Khusf County